The Faculty of Veterinary Medicine at Université de Montréal is one of five veterinary medical schools in Canada. It is the only French-language veterinary college in North America. The faculty is part of the Université de Montréal and is located in Saint-Hyacinthe, Quebec near Montreal.

The veterinary college was located in Oka, Quebec before moving to Saint-Hyacinthe in 1947. In Oka, the veterinary college formed part of an agricultural-veterinary educational centre operated by the Trappists. This centre was financed by the Quebec Department of Agriculture.

The Centre became the direct responsibility of the Québec Department of Agriculture from 1947 to 1969. In 1969, the Centre became a Université de Montréal faculty. Considerable development in staff and facilities has taken place.

The FMV holds a full accreditation of the American Veterinary Medical Association (AVMA) and is one of 15 faculties and affiliated schools of Université de Montréal

Studies
Doctorate of Veterinary Medicine  (438 students)
 96 students admitted / year
 5-year program (4 years of theory, 1 year of practical training)
 Program focused on skills
 Offered exclusively by the FMV in Quebec
 Very high quota (10 applications / admission)
 Feminization: More than 80% of female students

HIGHER EDUCATION

Internship (IPSAV) (28 students, 1-year program)
 Pet medicine
 Bovine medicine
 Equine medicine
 Porcine medicine
 Theriogenology
 Zoo and exotic pet medicine
Residency (33 students, 3-year program)
 Anesthesiology
 Laboratory animals
 Surgery
 Animal behavior
 Dentistry
 Dermatology
 Medical imagery
 Internal medicine
 Population medicine
 Zoological medicine
 Veterinary microbiology
 Neurology
 Ophthalmology
 Veterinary pathology
 Clinical pathology
 Theriogenology
 Emergency medicine and intensive care

Masters in Veterinary Science (80 students, 2-year program)
 Biomedicine
 Epidemiology
 Veterinary hygiene and food safety
 Medicine of laboratory animals
 Microbiology
 Pathology
 Pharmacology
 Reproduction
 Clinical science

Ph.D. in Veterinary Science (45 students, 3-year program)
 Epidemiology
 Microbiology
 Pathology
 Pharmacology
 Reproduction

Post doctorate studies (14 students)

Microprograms (32 students)
 Public health
 Companion animals

Research
Since 1972, the Faculty of Veterinary Medicine has been home to the Centre de Recherche en Reproduction Animale (CRRA) [Animal Reproduction Research Centre], a facility dedicated to the understanding of reproductive issues in large domestic animals (livestock).

Centres and Research Groups
 CRRF (Reproduction and Fertility Research Center): http://www.medvet.umontreal.ca/CRRA/index.php/en/
 DSA R&D (Herd Health Management)
 GRAC (Companion Animal Research Group)
 GREMEQ (Equine Research)
 GREMIP (Research Group on Infectious Diseases in Production Animals: http://www.medvet.umontreal.ca/gremip/index.php/en/
 GREPAQ (Animal pharmacology research group of Quebec)
 GRESA (Food Safety Research Group)
 GREZOSP (Research Group on Epidemiology of Zoonoses and Public Health)
 EcL (Escherichia coli Laboratory): http://www.ecl-lab.com/en/

Research Chairs
 Poultry (philanthropic chair)
 Research Chair in Meat Safety (CRSNG  Industrial Chair)

Research networks
 CQSAS (Québec Centre for Wild Animal Health)
 CRIPA (Swine and poultry infectious diseases research center)
 Bovine Mastitis (Canadian Bovine Mastitis and Milk Quality Research Network)
 RQR (Research Network on Reproduction)

Bioevaluation centers
 Animal houses
 Poultry research center
 Agro environmental platform REPA

See also
Université de Montréal
Fundraising Campaign

References

External links
 http://www.fmv.umontreal.ca/

Veterinary schools in Canada
Veterinary Medicine
Educational institutions established in 1969
1969 establishments in Quebec